Brunó Ferenc Straub (5 January 1914 in Nagyvárad, Austria-Hungary (now Oradea, Romania) – 15 February 1996) was a biochemist. As a young scholar he was a research assistant of Albert Szent-Györgyi at the University of Szeged, and subsequently worked at the Molteno Institute, Cambridge, UK. He is credited with the discovery of actin. He founded the Biological Research Centre in Szeged. He was the chairman of the Hungarian Presidential Council from 29 June 1988 to 23 October 1989. He proposed the theory of conformational selection in 1964; the same year the MWC model was proposed.

External links 

1914 births
1996 deaths
People from Oradea
Members of the National Assembly of Hungary (1985–1990)
Members of the German Academy of Sciences at Berlin
Hungarian biochemists
Members of the Royal Swedish Academy of Sciences